Dennis Everberg (born 31 December 1991) is a Swedish professional ice hockey winger for Rögle BK of the Swedish Hockey League (SHL). He has previously played in the NHL with the Colorado Avalanche.

Playing career
Everberg played as a youth with Västerås IK before joining Swedish professional club, Rögle BK. In the 2009–10 season, Everberg made his senior debut with Rögle in the Elitserien, appearing in 12 games, collecting a goal and an assist. On 8 May 2010, Everberg was signed to a two-year extension to further develop within Rögle BK.

In the following 2010–11 season, with a relegated Rögle returning to the HockeyAllsvenskan, Everberg featured more prominently with the senior side, contributing with five goals and 12 points in 41 games. Everberg was hampered by a shoulder injury that required surgery early in the 2011–12 season. Upon his eventual return in February, Everberg's developing power forward role became influential in promoting Rögle BK back to the Elitserien. He scored two goals and 6 points in 10 games in the postseason.

As one of Rögle's strongest players, he was re-signed to a further two-year extension on 8 May 2012. In the 2012–13 season, Everberg played his first full season in the Elitserien. Used primarily in a depth role, Everberg scored a modest five goals and 8 points in 55 games with lowly Rögle. In failing to maintain their SHL status, Everberg was relied upon by Rögle in the HockeyAllsvenskan during the 2013–14 season. As one of the team's biggest forwards, Everberg scored a team-leading 17 goals in 47 games, helping the club finish first in the SHL qualifiers. Everberg finished with eight goals in 16 games as the club finished third in promotion to remain in the HockeyAllsvenskan.

Under the influence of sporting director Anders Carlsson's former scouting links to the Colorado Avalanche, Everberg was signed to his first North American contract, agreeing to a two-year entry-level contract with the Avalanche on 28 May 2014. After making a strong impression at the Avalanche's 2014 training camp with his size and skating ability, Everberg surprisingly made the roster to begin the 2014–15 season. He made his NHL debut in an opening night defeat to the Minnesota Wild on 9 October 2014. Upon recall from AHL affiliate, the Lake Erie Monsters, he scored his first NHL goal with the Avalanche on 2 November 2014 against the Anaheim Ducks. With injuries plaguing the Avalanche, Everberg took advantage in securing a checking line role. Towards the conclusion of the regular season, Everberg suffered a shoulder injury against the Nashville Predators on 7 April 2015, which required surgery with a 6-month recovery period. Everberg completed his first North American season with three goals and 12 points in 55 games.

Everberg recovered for the Avalanche's 2015 training camp; however, he was limited in play after an early injury in the preseason. He was the last cut sent to begin the 2015–16 season with new AHL affiliate, the San Antonio Rampage. On the Rampage's top scoring line, Everberg found early success, contributing with 5 points in 3 games before he was recalled to the Avalanche on 22 October 2015. Everberg made his season debut against the Columbus Blue Jackets on 24 October and appeared in 15 scoreless games in a  fourth-line role. Having passed the games limit that exempted waiver eligibility, Everberg cleared before returning to the San Antonio Rampage on 27 November 2015.

As an impending restricted free agent at season's end, Everberg opted not to sign with Colorado and return to Sweden in signing a two-year contract with Växjö Lakers of the SHL on 6 May 2016 In the opening game of the 2016–17 season, Everberg made an immediate impact in his return to the SHL, scoring the opening goal and adding another in a 5–2 victory over former club, Rögle BK, on 22 September 2016. Everberg continued his scoring pace throughout the season, finishing second on the club with 37 points in 52 games.

In the off-season, Everberg opted to use his KHL release clause in order to forgo the final year of his contract with Växjö. On 18 May 2017, Everberg agreed to a lucrative one-year deal with Russian club, Avangard Omsk of the KHL. In the 2017–18 season, Everberg initially struggled to find his footing within Omsk, registering just 9 points in 34 games. On 11 December 2017, he was traded by Avangard to Neftekhimik Nizhnekamsk in exchange for fellow import, Chad Rau. Everberg instantly provided a spark with Nizhnekamsk, playing out the regular season to record five goals in just 16 games.

With the ambition to re-establish his NHL career, Everberg left the KHL as a free agent and agreed to a one-year, two-way contract with the Winnipeg Jets on 1 July 2018. On 13 November, the Jets placed Everberg on waivers with the intent to terminate his contract. On 14 November, he signed with EV Zug of the Swiss National League (NL) for the remained of the 2018–19 season. Everberg quickly adapted with Zug, regaining his scoring touch in contributing with 12 goals and 28 points in just 31 games. He continued his output in the playoffs, notching 8 points in 10 games.

As a free agent in the off-season, Everberg opted to return to his roots, signing a five-year contract with original Swedish club, Rögle BK of the SHL, on 23 April 2019.

International play

Everberg, as a late bloomer, made his first appearance for Sweden at the international stage at the senior level of the Euro Hockey Tour during the 2016–17 season. He remained on the pre-tournament squad in preparation for the 2017 IIHF World Championship in Germany/France. Despite initially being left of the final roster for the Tournament, Everberg was later added and made his debut in an 8–1 round-robin victory against Italy on 12 May 2017. He scored his first goal, the game-winner, and added an assist in a 4–2 victory over Slovakia on 16 May 2017. In helping Sweden capture the Gold Medal, Everberg completed the tournament scoring two goals and 3 points in 6 games.

During the 2017–18 season, with the exclusion of NHL contracted players, Everberg was selected to represent Sweden at the 2018 Winter Olympics in Pyeongchang, South Korea. Used in a checking-line role, Everberg contributed with 2 points in 4 games in a 5th-place finish.

Career statistics

Regular season and playoffs

International

References

External links

1991 births
Living people
Avangard Omsk players
Colorado Avalanche players
Lake Erie Monsters players
Ice hockey players at the 2018 Winter Olympics
Ice hockey players at the 2022 Winter Olympics
Manitoba Moose players
Olympic ice hockey players of Sweden
HC Neftekhimik Nizhnekamsk players
Rögle BK players
San Antonio Rampage players
Sportspeople from Västerås
Swedish expatriate ice hockey players in the United States
Swedish ice hockey right wingers
Undrafted National Hockey League players
Växjö Lakers players
EV Zug players